Jasień  is a town in Poland, in Lubusz Voivodeship, in Żary County. It has 4,309 inhabitants (2019).

History

During World War II Jasień was the location of the Nazi German slave labour camp AL Gassen, one of nearly one hundred subcamps of the Gross-Rosen concentration camp. Its prisoners, mostly Poles, Soviet prisoners of war, Czechs, Croats and Frenchmen, were making warplane parts for Focke-Wulf AG. The camp, with around 700 acutely malnourished prisoners, operated from August 1944 until 13 February 1945, when the remaining workforce was sent on a death march to the Buchenwald concentration camp ahead of the Soviet advance.

Sports
The local football club is Stal Jasień. It competes in the lower leagues.

Twin towns – sister cities
See twin towns of Gmina Jasień.

References

External links
Official town website, Jasien.com.pl
Lake Resort, Zawiaty.com

Cities and towns in Lubusz Voivodeship
Żary County